Grace Garland (sometimes credited as Grace Garland Janisz) was a British film editor active from the 1940s through the 1980s.

Selected filmography 

 Bonnie Prince Charlie (1948)
 Nightbeat (1947)
 Beware of Pity (1946)
 Don Chicago (1945)
 Strawberry Roan (1944) 
 The Gay Intruders (1944) 
 The Shipbuilders (1943) (associate editor) 
 Let the People Sing (1942) (assistant editor) 
 The Common Touch (1941) (assistant editor)

References

External links

British women film editors
British film editors